Rolando Chaparro (born August 2, 1965 in Asunción) is a Paraguayan musician. Son of Rolando Chaparro (professional photographer) and Celia María Benítez (actress)

First steps 

He was very interested in music since an early age and at the age of 9 he made of the guitar his main instrument. He studied with Kuki Rey and initiated in the jazz studying by 4 years with Carlos Schvartzman. He formed later with Carlos Schvartzman, Remigio Pereira and Mario Rodríguez an experimental musical quartet with jazzy tendencies.

Career 

In 1984 he grouped with Berta Rojas and Carlos Noguera.

in 1985 he joined to “Síntesis” (Synthesis), a jazz-fusion and folkloric projection group, performing in many places of Asunción.

Between 1987 and 1991 worked with Ñamandu (the duet of Alejandrino “Chondi” Paredes and Ricardo Flecha), forming a folkloric tendency trio, touring and recording in many Latin American countries.

In 1991 joined back to Síntesis, this time with new people. Parallelly, he also joined the jazz-fusion and folkloric projection band of the saxophonist William “Palito” Miranda, performing in the international festivals of Posadas, Argentina; Viña del Mar, Chile and Sao Paulo, Brazil.

In May 1994 he performed with Síntesis in the Memorial of Latin America of Sao Paulo and in Buenos Aires. Later that year he definitively left Síntesis to form a new band “Krhizya”, with rock tendency.

With Krhizya he records an album in which could be found a classic in the Paraguayan folkloric music, "Reservista Purahéi", but in a blues version, something never done before. This way, Rolando Chaparro marked a hit referring to rock covers of Paraguayan folkloric music.

As a composer he's one of the most outstanding. His production is of about a thousand pieces including jazz-fusion, folkloric projection, music for theater plays, commercial jingles, music for TV shows, among others.
 
He also developed soloist projects, like “Guitarreros”, with Efrén Echeverría, Juan Cancio Barreto and Barni Chaparro, performing in various theaters of Paraguay.

He played in a concert with the harpist César Cataldo, obtaining very positive critics from the press.

He performed many times with the Symphonic Orchestra of the City of Asunción in very important concerts, recording two discs due to the amazing success of them.
	
He participated in the soundtrack of the Paraguayan film “Miramenometokéi” with a song of his own “Espinas del alma” and with a version of the Paraguayan popular music “Soy algo fácil de olvidar” (I'm something easy to forget).

He was awarded many times by the radio show The Lost Flare.

Work 

Discography: all of them include music made by him

Rolando Chaparro performed in countries like México, Perú, Uruguay, Chile, Brazil, Argentina, among others, many times and with different styles.

Actually he's teaching at the National Conservatory of Asunción.

He might be considered as the most diverse instrumentalist in the new generation of Paraguayan musicians.

Some of his most famous works

References 
Luis Szaran
Pilsen Rock

Paraguayan guitarists
1965 births
Living people